Willeman is a commune in the Pas-de-Calais department in the Hauts-de-France region of France. This village has the southernmost Dutch name in France coming from its original Germanic roots.

Geography
Surrounded by woodland, Willeman is located 21 miles (34 km) southeast of Montreuil-sur-Mer, on the D110 and D98 crossroads and 5miles (8k) southeast of Hesdin in the heart of the ‘7 vallées’ countryside. A small stream, the Riviérette, a tributary of the Canche flows through the village.

Population

Places of interest
 The church of St. Sulpice, dating from the fifteenth century.
 The château, whose façades and roof, along with a dovecote, are listed as historic monuments.
 A seventeenth century manor house, the Manoir de Vallières.

See also
 Communes of the Pas-de-Calais department

References

Communes of Pas-de-Calais
Artois